Amélie Mauresmo was the defending champion, but lost in the quarterfinals to Elena Dementieva.

Justine Henin-Hardenne won in the final 6–1, 6–0, against Lina Krasnoroutskaya.

Seeds
The top eight seeds receive a bye into the second round. 

  Kim Clijsters (third round)
  Justine Henin-Hardenne (champion)
  Amélie Mauresmo (quarterfinals)
  Daniela Hantuchová (third round)
  Anastasia Myskina (third round)
  Magdalena Maleeva (second round)
  Amanda Coetzer (third round)
  Jelena Dokić (third round)
  Elena Dementieva (semifinals)
  Vera Zvonareva (quarterfinals)
  Silvia Farina Elia (first round)
  Elena Bovina (quarterfinals)
  Eleni Daniilidou (first round)
  Nadia Petrova (third round)
  Nathalie Dechy (second round)
  Svetlana Kuznetsova (first round)

Draw

Finals

Top half

Section 1

Section 2

Bottom half

Section 3

Section 4

External links
Draw and Qualifying Draw

2003 Canada Masters and the Rogers AT&T Cup
Rogers ATandT Cup